The 1938 Home Nations Championship was the thirty-fourth series of the rugby union Home Nations Championship. Including the previous incarnations as the Five Nations, and prior to that, the Home Nations, this was the fifty-first series of the northern hemisphere rugby union championship. Six matches were played between 15 January and 19 March. It was contested by England, Ireland, Scotland and Wales. Scotland won their 12th title, also winning the Triple Crown and the Calcutta Cup.

Participants
The teams involved were:

Table

Results

References

External links

1938
Home Nations
Home Nations
Home Nations
Home Nations
Home Nations
Home Nations Championship
Home Nations Championship
Home Nations Championship